Minyuan Stadium, in Tianjin, China, was used mostly for football matches and hosted the home matches of Tianjin Teda F.C. until the TEDA Football Stadium opened in 2004.  The stadium held 18,000 spectators.  Eric Liddell helped build the stadium when he was a missionary in Tianjin in 1926, modelling it on Stamford Bridge of London, which was Liddell's favourite athletics venue.

Minyuan Stadium was closed and remodelled over a two-year period starting in 2012. It re-opened as a public square in 2014.

References

External links
 Stadium information

Football venues in Tianjin
Sports venues in Tianjin